Phu Khiao Wildlife Sanctuary (or written as Phu Khieo) is a wildlife sanctuary in Thailand. It overlaps with three districts of Chaiyaphum province, namely Khon San, Kaset Sombun, and Nong Bua Daeng, covering 975,000 rai (about 1,560 km²).

It features natural Arundinaria pusilla grassland on the undulated hills alternating with the forest line that make it look like continuous waves with many streams running through it and is surrounded with hill evergreen forest. This grassland is well-known as a breeding ground for endangered wildlife like hog deer, a medium-sized deer that is almost extinct in Thailand. Nowadays, they are distributed throughout the wildlife sanctuary. The surrounding area of Thung Kamang consists of many reservoirs.

References

External links

Wildlife sanctuaries of Thailand
1972 establishments in Thailand
Protected areas established in 1972
Geography of Chaiyaphum province